Tingel Tangel is a 1927 Austrian silent film directed by Gustav Ucicky and starring Dolly Davis, Igo Sym and Rudolf Klein-Rogge.

The film's sets were designed by the art director Artur Berger.

Cast
 Dolly Davis as Li Bergmeister  
 Igo Sym as Marquese de la Mota  
 Rudolf Klein-Rogge as Don Fabio Coridon  
 Paul Hartmann as Derfinger, Sekretär  
 Tilla Shell as Dolores  
 Hans Peppler as Don Pepe Coridon  
 Tini Senders as Sängerin  
 Viktor Franz as Wirt 
 Karl Hartl as Le chef de station

References

Bibliography
 Reimer, Robert C. & Reimer, Carol J. The A to Z of German Cinema. Scarecrow Press, 2010.

External links

1927 films
Films directed by Gustav Ucicky
Austrian silent feature films
Austrian black-and-white films